The Surat Developmental Road (State Route 87) is a sealed road in the Western Downs Region, Queensland, Australia. Localities en route are Tara, The Gums and Glenmorgan.

The road crosses the Leichhardt Highway (A5) at The Gums, and terminates at the Carnarvon Highway (A55) at Surat.

Major intersections

See also

 Highways in Australia
 List of highways in Queensland

References

Roads in Queensland
Highways in Queensland